Shahram Kashani or Shahrum Kashani (7 July 1971 – 28 July 2021), also known as Shahram Sebastian Shahbal was an Iranian pop singer. He released eight albums with notable hits.

Biography

Music
Shahrum's interest in singing and music manifested at an early age. He started his career in 1990; however, it was not until 1992 that he released his professional debut album titled K-One, promoted by Alireza Amirghassemi, and also with support of Persian super star Leila Forouhar. Due to his youth, synergy, and style, he gained popularity in a short amount of time.

International popularity came with his second album Atash with hits like Begou Tou Begou and Khater Khah. In 2001, he stopped working with Caltex Records and instead signed on with Taraneh Records. This collaboration yielded a couple of instant bestsellers. The hit songs Dokhtar Bandari, Yadam Nemirehand Dige Basteh became club favorites. In a 2005 interview with Tapesh, Shahrum talked about his childhood, about his parents' divorce and his mom's short marriage to Googoosh's first husband. Shahrum also, in this interview, blamed Taraneh Records for not promoting his new album Khoshalam enough and delaying its release. His claim was dismissed by the owner of Taraneh, Vartan Avenassian, who cited immaturity of the singer as cause of their tense relationship.

In August 2006, Shahrum's new music video from his latest album Game Over (directed by élan productions), was aired on all Persian satellite channels. Despite his complications with the record company, this album was still released by Taraneh Records. His latest music, Sahneh Sazi, was performed at Valley Oaks Memorial Park at his funeral, and artists such as Andranik Madadian and Shahbal Shabpareh attended his funeral and spoke about Shahrum. Ali Hosseinzadeh, composer and songwriter of Shahram Kashani's latest song, explained about this song in an interview with KIRN Los Angeles Radio. "The idea of making this song was formed many years ago, considering the events that took place in Shahrum's personal life, I wrote this song. Shahrum called this song an elevator because I refer to life somewhere in the poem, which is like an elevator. زندگی ی آسانسوره یکیو بالا میبره اون که پایینه دلخوره Life is like an elevator, it raises some up, but he who is down is sad. Shahrum went to his studio in Los Angeles twice to record this song and recorded it several times. Because he was telling me I think my feelings are not real".

Health
Shahrum had a long battle with alcoholism and was sober for several months during his stay in Istanbul, but relapsed months prior to his death. Legendary Iranian singer, Dariush Eghbali tried to help him with his alcoholism. He died in hospital in  Istanbul from COVID-19, while being treated for liver problems brought on by alcoholism.

Discography 
Caltex Records releases
 1991: K-One
 1994: Atash
 1996: Havas
 1998: Friends

Taraneh Records releases
 2000: Color Of Love
 2003: Don't Tell
 2005: Khoshalam
 2006: Game Over

Soundtracks

Single Songs

Videography
DVD Releases
 Khoshalam (included in the Khoshalam Album)

Taraneh Records 
 Kheyli Vaghteh

References

External links
 
 Shahram Kashani on Instagram

2021 deaths
Musicians from Rome
Iranian emigrants to the United States
Caltex Records artists
Taraneh Records artists
Deaths from the COVID-19 pandemic in Turkey
Artists from Los Angeles
1971 births
People from Rome
Iranian pop singers
Iranian male singers
People from Tehran
21st-century Iranian male singers
20th-century Iranian male singers
Iranian classical singers
Iranian music historians
Persian-language singers
Singers from Tehran
Singers from Los Angeles
Musicians from Tehran
Iranian pop musicians
Burials at Valley Oaks Memorial Park
Iranian people of Armenian descent
American male pop singers
20th-century American male singers
20th-century American singers
Exiles of the Iranian Revolution in the United States